Wisent is an alternative name for the European bison.

Wisent may also refer to:
 Wisent (eisbrecher) an icebreaker operated by the German Wasser und Schifffahrtsamt
 Wisent (co-operative exercise), a series of Polish-Estonian joint-military exercises 
 Wisent (vehicle), a German military vehicle
 Wisent (vodka), a flavored Polish vodka

A large Air-cushioned landing craft (i.e. built in the Ukraine and exported to the PR of China) is known as 'European Bison'